Brigitte Becue (born 18 September 1972 in Ostend) is a retired breaststroke and medley swimmer from Belgium, who competed for her native country at four consecutive Summer Olympics, starting in 1988. In 1989, she won the silver medal in the women's 200 metres breaststroke at the European Aquatics Championships in Bonn, West Germany.

Becue reached her highest peak at the 1995 European Aquatics Championships in Vienna, where she won three medals (two gold, one silver). She twice was named Belgian Sportswoman of the Year (1994 and 1995).

Becue finished 10th overall in the 2007 Dakar Rally as co-driver of Stéphane Henrard.

References
 Personal website

1972 births
Living people
Belgian female medley swimmers
Belgian female breaststroke swimmers
Swimmers at the 1988 Summer Olympics
Swimmers at the 1992 Summer Olympics
Swimmers at the 1996 Summer Olympics
Swimmers at the 2000 Summer Olympics
Olympic swimmers of Belgium
Sportspeople from Ostend
World Aquatics Championships medalists in swimming
European Aquatics Championships medalists in swimming